The 1958 NBA World Championship Series was the championship series for the 1957–58 National Basketball Association (NBA) season, and the culmination of the season's playoffs. It pitted the Western Division champion St. Louis Hawks against the Eastern Division champion Boston Celtics.  The Hawks won the series in six games to win the franchise's first and only NBA title. This was the last Finals until 1967 that wasn't won by the Celtics, and the last until 1971 that was won by the Western Conference.

Recap
After being defeated by the Celtics in Game 7 of the 1957 NBA Finals, St. Louis survived a sometimes difficult 1957-58 NBA season en route to winning the Western Division crown with a 41-31 record. The Celtics, meanwhile, had dominated the Eastern Division with a 49-23 record. 

The Hawks upset the Celtics (with a healthy Russell) in Game 1 at the Boston Garden, 104-102. Boston struck back with a wipeout in Game 2, 136-112. In St. Louis, the Hawks prevailed 111-108 in Game 3 when Russell severely sprained his ankle. Without Russell, the Celtics evened the series with a 109-98 surprise victory in Game 4. St. Louis forced a 102-100 win in Game 5 in Boston to take the series lead. 

Back home in Kiel Auditorium on April 12, the Hawks weren't about to miss their opportunity to defeat the defending champions. Pettit turned in a spectacular performance. He scored 31 points in the first three quarters, then zoomed off in the final period, nailing 19 of his team's last 21 points. His last two points, on a tip-in with 15 seconds remaining, put the Hawks ahead 110-107. The Celtics scored one final bucket but could do no more. The Hawks finally had a title, 110-109. Pettit had scored 50 points, including 18 of the Hawks' final 21 points in propelling the Hawks to the championship. Pettit's 50 points set a new Finals record for most scored by a player in a series-clinching game, a record that would finally be tied by Giannis Antetokounmpo in 2021
 
Most observers figured that the Celtics probably would have won the 1958 title if Russell hadn't suffered his ankle injury in game 3. Auerbach, however, found no comfort in that opinion. "You can always look for excuses," he said. "We just got beat."

Series summary

Hawks win series 4–2

Team rosters

St. Louis Hawks

Boston Celtics

See also
1958 NBA Playoffs

References

 1957-58 NBA Season Summary, basketball-reference.com. Retrieved March 29, 2014.

External links
NBA History

Finals
National Basketball Association Finals
NBA
NBA
NBA Finals
NBA Finals
Basketball competitions in Boston
Basketball competitions in St. Louis
NBA Finals, 1958
NBA Finals, 1958
NBA Finals
NBA Finals